Enver Petrovci (born 28 February 1954 in Pristina) is a Kosovo-Albanian actor, writer and director. He went to high school in Prishtina and completed acting school in Belgrade.

He played as Hamlet, Macbeth, Julius Cesar and other famous Shakespearian characters. He is one of the founders of the Dodona Theatre and the Acting School in Prishtina.

Petrovci provides the voice of Mufasa in the Albanian dub of The Lion King franchise.

Filmography

2013 O sa mirë as Gazmend Berisha (TV series)
2011 Top je bio vreo (post-production) as Sakib
2010 The War Is Over as Principal Milić
2009 Gomaret e kufirit as Border Police Commander
2008 Sekretet as Mero
2006 Anatema as Col. Lilić
2005 Lost Son (short movie)
2004 10 Minuta (short movie) by Burim Haliti
2003 Black Flowers as Nan Golemi
2000 Gorski vijenac (TV movie) as Skender Aga
1998 Tri palme za dve bitange i ribicu as Skočajić
1998 The Hornet as Salih
1994 Nekrologji
1993 Laksi slucaj smrti (TV movie) as Relja's father
1992 Bulevar revolucije
1992 Prokleta je Amerika as Pantić (segment from "Sangarepo, ti ne rastes lepo")
1991 Bolji zivot 2 (TV series) as Florijan Trajković
1991 Krug (short)
1991 Djelidba (TV movie)
1991 Praznik u Sarajevu
1990 Sex-partijski neprijatelj br. 1 as Drndač
1990 Gluvi barut as Uros
1990 Narodni poslanik (TV movie)
1990 Sekulic - Police official
1990 Stanica obicnih vozova
1990 East of East (as Enver Petrović)
1990 Migjeni (TV movie) as Albanian writer Millosh Gjergj Nikolla alias Migjeni
1989-1990 Specijalna redakcija (TV series) as Bekteši
1989 Hajde da se volimo 2 as Omer
1989 Forbidden Sun as Lt. Ionnides
1989 Obicna prica (TV movie)
1989 Sargarepo ti ne rastes lepo (TV movie)
1988 Manifesto as The King
1988 Ortaci as John Smith Fitzgerald Petrovci
1988 The Bizarre Country as the New Police Chief
1988 A Film with No Nam
1988 Decji bic (TV movie) as Rade Pajic 'Pera'
1988 Rojet e mjegulles
1987 Uvek spremne zene as Raša
1987 Zivot u grobljanskoj (TV movie) as Marković (prison educator)
1986 Jugovizija (TV movie) as Host
1986 Vrenje (TV movie)
1985 Rade Vujovic as Liht
1985 Dvostruki udar (TV movie)
1984 Opasni trag as Cemail
1984 Lazar
1983 Stepenice za nebo as Predrag Vučković
1982 Krojaci dzinsa (TV movie)
1981 Sedam sekretara SKOJ-a (TV series) as
Josip Kolumbo
Episode #1.6 (1981) … Josip Kolumbo
Episode #1.4 (1981) … Josip Kolumbo
Episode #1.3 (1981) … Josip Kolumbo
Episode #1.2 (1981) … Josip Kolumbo
1980 Kur pranvera vonohet (TV mini-series)
1979 Kur pranvera vonohet (Movie)
1979 Jutarnji disk dzokej (TV movie)
1979 Slom (TV series) as Slobodan Dimitrijevic
1979 Ti medjutim stojis na velikoj reci (TV movie)

References

1954 births
Living people
Kosovan male actors
Kosovo Albanians
Actors from Pristina